General Villamil, also known as Playas, is a Guayas canton in Ecuador. The Playas canton is located at the south western area of the Guayas Province. Its Canton Capital is General José de Villamil, also known as Playas. It is located 96 kilómeters from the capital of the Guayas Province, Guayaquil. It borders to the north and east with Guayaquil Canton, on the west with Santa Elena Province, and to south with the Pacific Ocean.

Demographics
Ethnic groups as of the Ecuadorian census of 2010:
Mestizo  74.2%
Afro-Ecuadorian  10.8%
White  6.6%
Montubio  4.8%
Indigenous  1.9%
Other  1.7%

Weather

Natural resources
The terrain at Playas canton is mostly plain, but to the north there are few hills like:
 cerro Colorado
 cerro Picón
 cerro Cantera
It has a large coastline; the main beaches are located to the south.
The main rivers in the Playas Canton are: Arena River, Moñones and Tambiche.
The weather is hot and dry. The beaches are freshened by the ocean wind.

The land is mostly arid due to the long term droughts and the hot weather. The most common native plant is the algarrobo, which sprouts the algarrobita, used as a high quality energizant.
One of the main activities of the canton is fishing. Along with local independent fishermen, there are mostly shrimp and tuna industries.
The Ecuadorian sea provides Playas a great variety of fish and seafood that along with the tourism and pool shrimp sowing conform the main activities of its population.

Tourism
Playas, being at 97 kilometers from Guayaquil, receives a large number of tourists from the province capital, as well as from the rest of Ecuador. The canton receives tourism boost on the hot months from January to April, period of time known as "the beach season".
Its main festivities, events and carnivals are:

JANUARY
Cabalgata de los Reyes (Kings Horse riding)
FEBRUARY
Carnival in Playas
Election of Carnival's Queen
International Skate Board championship "Playas Xtreme"
MARCH
Beach Volleyball Southamerican circuit
Bicycle racing
APRIL
Master Championship of Nautic mile
Surf Championship
Raft Race
JUNE
Fishermen "San Pedro" folk holiday
JULY
Winter "Beach Season" opening
AUGUST
Celebration and parade for tursm workers.
Parties in canton-becoming day.
SEPTEMBER
Merced Virgin honor celebrations.

References

Cantons of Guayas Province